

Ottoman walis (1638–1704)

 Kashik Hassan Pasha (1638–1639)
 Darwesh Pasha (1639–1642)
 Kashik Hassan (1642–1644)
 Daly Hussain (1644–1644)
 Mohamed Pasha (1644–1645)
 Mussa Pasha (1645–1646)
 Ibrahim Pasha (1646–1646)
 Mussa Semiz (1546–1647)
 Malik Ahmed (1647–1647)
 Arsalan Najdi Zadah (1647–1649)
 Kablan Mustafa Marzonly (1649–1649)
 Hussain Pasha (1649–1650)
 Qarah Mustafa (1651–1652)
 Murtazah (1653–1654)
 Aq Mohamed (1654–1656)
 Khasiky Mohamed (1657–1659)
 Mustafa Pasha (1659–1659)
 Khasiky Mohamed (1659–1661)
 Kanbur Mustafa (1661–1663)
 Bambej Mustafa (1663–1664)
 Qarah Mustafa (1664–1664)
 Uzon Ibrahim (1664–1666)
 Qarah Mustafa (1666–1671)
 Selihdar Hussain (1671–1674)
 Abdulrahman Pasha (1674–1676)
 Kablan Mustafa Marzonly (1676–1677)
 Omar Pasha (1677–1681)
 Ibrahim Pasha (1681–1684)
 Omar Pasha (1684–1686)
 Shokoh Ahmed Katkothah (1686–1686)
 Omar Pasha (1686–1687)
 Hassan Pasha (1688–1690)
 Ahmed Bazergan (1690–1690)
 Ahmed Pasha (1691–1693)
 Haji Ahmed Qalayli (1693–1695)
 Ali Pasha (1695–1695)
 Hassan Pasha (1696–1698)
 Ismael Pasha (1698–1700)
 Ali Pasha (1700–1702)
 Youssef Pasha (1703–1704)

Mamluk walis (1704–1831)

The Mamluks ruled the pashaliks of Baghdad, Basrah, and Shahrizor. The pashalik of Mosul was ruled by the Iraqi Jalili dynasty. 

Hasan Pasha (1704–1723)
Ahmad Pasha (1723–1747) son of Hasan
Sulayman Abu Layla Pasha (1749–1762) son-in-law of Ahmad
Omar Pasha (1762–1776) son of Ahmad
Abdullah Pasha (1776–1777)
Sulayman Pasha the Great (1780–1802) son of Omar
Ali Pasha (1802–1807) son of Omar
Sulayman Pasha the Little (1807-1810) son of Sulayman Great
Said Pasha (1813–1816) son of Sulayman Great
Dawud Pasha (1816–1831)

Ottoman walis (1831–1917)

1831–1902

1902–1917

References

See also
 History of Baghdad 1638-1704
 History of Baghdad 1831-1917
 Mamluk dynasty of Iraq
 Ottoman Iraq
 List of Safavid governors of Baghdad

Government of Baghdad